Sanicula europaea, the sanicle or wood sanicle, is a perennial plant of the family Apiaceae.

It has traditionally been a favoured ingredient of many herbal remedies, and of it was said "he who has sanicle and self-heal needs neither physician nor surgeon".

Description
Sanicula europea L. grows to 60 cm high and is glabrous with coarsely toothed leaves.
The pinkish flowers are borne in tight spherical umbels and are followed by bristly fruits which easily attach to clothing or animal fur and are thus easily distributed. The leaves are lobed and glossy, dark green.

Habitat
It is widespread in shady places in woodland across Europe.

Etymology
Sanicula comes from sanus, Latin for "healthy", reflecting its use in traditional remedies.

Uses
Sanicula europaea was used in Europe for healing wounds and cleaning. Filtered leaf extracts of sanicula europaea have shown some antiviral properties, inhibiting the replication of type 2 Human parainfluenza viruses (HPIV-2).

Infusions of sanicle, made with water or wine, were commonly used in France to cure dysentery, ulcers and kidney injuries. To this list Culpeper added that sanicle heals tumours in any part of the body, and alleviates gonorrhoea, bowel pain and more.

The roots have been used in the traditional Austrian medicine internally (as tea) or externally (as ointment) for treatment of disorders of the skin, respiratory tract, locomotor system, gastrointestinal tract, and infections.

References

External links
 1510 book Compendium medicine tam morborum universalium quam particularium nondum

Medicinal plants
crassicaulis
Plants described in 1753
Taxa named by Carl Linnaeus